American Nerd: The Story of My People is a book by Benjamin Nugent. The book discusses the history and origin of the term "nerd", as well as what the term means in today's age. Some of the important topics discussed include the racial differences for the term "nerd", such as how race played into Urkel, a nerdy character played by Jaleel White on the TV series Family Matters.

Appearances 
The book and the author were featured on Last Call with Carson Daly as well as The Sound of Young America on NPR.

References 
 americannerdbook.com

2008 non-fiction books
Nerd culture